The Brachina meteorite is the type specimen of the brachinites class of the asteroidal achondrites.

Naming and discovery
The meteorite is named after Brachina in South Australia.

Description
The mineral composition of the Brachina meteorite is olivine (80%), plagioclase (10%), Clinopyroxene (5.5%), iron-sulfide (3%), chromite (0.5%), chlorapatite (0.5%) and pentlandite (0.3%) and traces of meteoric iron. Melt inclusions consist of glass with orthopyroxene and anorthoclase. The chemical and mineralogical composition is similar to the Chassigny meteorite, but the trace elements are fundamentally different.

Parent body
Melt inclusions indicate that there were melting processes active on the brachinite parent body.

Classification
The meteorite was classified as a chassignite in 1978, but in 1983 trace element analysis showed that the Brachina meteorite was fundamentally different from Chassigny. It was therefore proposed that the meteorite should be the type specimen of a new meteorite class, the brachinites. This classification has remained valid since then.

See also
 Glossary of meteoritics

References

 

Achondrite meteorites
Meteorites found in Australia
Far North (South Australia)